Touro may refer to:

People
 Isaac Touro (1738–1783), a Jewish leader in colonial America.
 Judah Touro (1775–1854), a Jewish leader in colonial America and son of Isaac Touro.

Institutions
 Touro Synagogue, the oldest Synagogue in the United States, located in Newport, Rhode Island.
 Touro Synagogue (New Orleans), a synagogue in New Orleans
 Touro College, an Orthodox Jewish college in New York City.
 Touro College Jacob D. Fuchsberg Law Center, a law school in Central Islip, New York.
 Touro College of Osteopathic Medicine, a medical school in Harlem, New York
 Touro University College of Medicine, a proposed medical school in Hackensack, New Jersey
 Touro University, a division of Touro College
 Touro University California, a medical, pharmacy and physician assistant's school in Vallejo, California.
 Touro University Nevada, a medical, pharmacy and nursing school in Henderson, Nevada.
 Touro University Rome, a Business and Management school in Zagarolo, Italy.
 Touro Infirmary, a hospital in New Orleans, Louisiana

Locations
 Touro, Spain, a municipality in Galicia, A Coruña, Spain
 Touro, New Orleans, Louisiana, United States, a neighborhood
 Touro, Póvoa de Varzim, Portugal, a square and a monument

Other uses
 Touro (HGST), family of HGST cloud storage backup products.

Sephardic surnames